Balauru is a surname. Notable people with the surname include:

Dan Balauru (born 1980), Romanian footballer
Dragoș Balauru (born 1989), Romanian footballer

Romanian-language surnames